Lu Xun (183 – 19 March 245), courtesy name Boyan, also sometimes referred to as Lu Yi, was a Chinese military general and politician of the state of Eastern Wu during the Three Kingdoms period of China. He started his career as an official under the warlord Sun Quan in the 200s during the late Eastern Han dynasty and steadily rising through the ranks. In 219, he assisted Sun Quan's general Lü Meng in an invasion of Jing Province, which led to the defeat and death of Liu Bei's general Guan Yu. In 222, he served as the field commander of the Wu army in the Battle of Xiaoting against Liu Bei's forces and scored a decisive victory over the enemy. Lu Xun reached the pinnacle of his career after this battle as Sun Quan regarded him more highly, promoted him to higher positions and bestowed upon him unprecedented honours. Throughout the middle and the later parts of his career, Lu Xun oversaw and managed both civil and military affairs in Wu while participating in some battles against Wu's rival state, Wei, from time to time. In his final years, Lu Xun was drawn into a succession struggle between Sun Quan's sons and fell out of Sun Quan's favour as a consequence. He managed to retain his appointment as Imperial Chancellor – an office he assumed in 244 – but died a year later in frustration. Lu Xun's role in the Wu government was likened to that of a custos morum as he believed firmly in and upheld Confucian principles and practices. On the one hand, he provided constant and timely advice to Sun Quan to exercise benevolence and consider the welfare of the people. On the other hand, he vehemently objected to Sun Quan's idea of replacing his legitimate heir apparent in favour of a younger son.

Family background
Lu Xun's original given name was "Yi", hence he was sometimes referred to as "Lu Yi" in older historical records. He was born in a family of high social status in Wu County, Wu Commandery, which is present-day Suzhou, Jiangsu. His grandfather Lu Yu and father Lu Jun served as officials in the government of the Eastern Han dynasty. The Lu clan, which he was from, was one of the four most influential clans in Wu Commandery and also in the Jiangdong region at the time.

As he was orphaned at a young age, Lu Xun was raised by his granduncle, Lu Kang（陸康）, who served as the Administrator of Lujiang Commandery under the Han government. Lu Kang was originally on friendly terms with the warlord Yuan Shu, but relations between them soured after Lu Kang broke ties with Yuan Shu when the latter declared himself emperor – an act deemed treasonous against the Han emperor. When Lu Kang heard that Yuan Shu was planning to attack Lujiang Commandery, he immediately sent Lu Xun and his relatives back to Wu Commandery for their safety. After Lu Kang died from illness during the siege of Lujiang, Lu Xun became the new head of the Lu family because he was older than Lu Ji (Lu Kang's son) in terms of age, even though Lu Ji（陸績） was one generation older than him.

Early career

As a county-level official
In the early 200s, when Lu Xun was 20 years old, he came to serve the warlord Sun Quan, who was nominally a subject of the Han emperor, but had full autonomy in governing the territories in Jiangdong he inherited from his elder brother, Sun Ce. Lu Xun started his career as a minor officer in Sun Quan's office. He later became a Foreman Clerk in the East and West Bureaus and the Tuntian Commandant of Haichang (海昌屯田都尉; jurisdiction in present-day Haining, Zhejiang), before he was appointed as a county-level official. When the county was plagued by consecutive years of drought, Lu Xun opened up the granaries and distributed food supplies to the people, and promoted agriculture. The people benefited from his policies. At the time, there were many households in Wu, Kuaiji, and Danyang commanderies who were hiding from the government because they wanted to evade taxes and conscription. Lu Xun had them tracked down, registered and resettled. Some able-bodied young men were drafted for military service while others were recruited for agricultural labour.

Eliminating bandit forces
Early in his career, Lu Xun joined Sun Quan's forces in eliminating bandits in the Jiangdong territories who had been terrorising the region for years and posed serious threats to Sun Quan's administration. He organised a militia to attack the bandits led by Pan Lin in Kuaiji Commandery, passing through treacherous territory and pacifying those who stood in his way. The number of troops under his command increased to over 2,000. When another bandit chief, You Tu, caused trouble in Poyang County, Lu Xun led an army to attack the bandits and achieved success. He was commissioned as Colonel Who Establishes Might and ordered to garrison at Lipu County.

Lu Xun once advised Sun Quan to eliminate local bandit forces in Jiangdong first because they would hinder him in his aims to achieve supremacy over China. Sun Quan heeded Lu Xun's words and appointed him as a Commandant of the Right Section under him. Fei Zhan, a bandit chief in Danyang Commandery, had received an official appointment from Cao Cao, a leading warlord who was also the de facto head of the Han government. Cao Cao had secretly instructed Fei Zhan to instigate the Shanyue tribes in Jiangdong to cause trouble for Sun Quan. In response, Sun Quan sent Lu Xun to attack Fei Zhan. Lu Xun had a much smaller army as compared to Fei Zhan, but he deceived the enemy into thinking that he had more troops. He prepared more flags and banners, spread out his war drums, ordered his men to sneak into the valleys at night and beat the drums loudly, so as to create an illusion of an overwhelming army. He emerged victorious over Fei Zhan.

Lu Xun sent his troops into the three commanderies in eastern Jiangdong, where he drafted many able-bodied young men for military service while the less physically fit ones were recruited for agricultural labour. He drafted tens of thousands of soldiers in total. He also cleared the region of opposing forces before returning to a garrison at Wuhu.

Conflict with Chunyu Shi
Chunyu Shi, the Administrator of Kuaiji Commandery, once accused Lu Xun of oppressing and disturbing the common people. When Lu Xun travelled to Wu Commandery to meet Sun Quan and explain himself, he praised Chunyu Shi for being an excellent civil official. Sun Quan was puzzled so he asked Lu Xun, "Chunyu Shi made accusations against you, yet you praise him. Why?" Lu Xun replied, "Chunyu Shi was concerned about the people's welfare when he made accusations against me. If I rebuked him, I'll be violating my principles. This is something I won't do." Sun Quan said, "This is something a person with good morals will do and something which ordinary people aren't capable of doing."

Invasion of Jing Province

Planning for the invasion
Around 215, about six years after the Battle of Red Cliffs, Sun Quan had territorial disputes with his ally, Liu Bei, over southern Jing Province. Tensions between them nearly escalated to the point of armed conflict. However, after tense negotiations between Lu Su (Sun Quan's representative) and Guan Yu (Liu Bei's representative), both sides eventually agreed to divide southern Jing Province between their respective domains along the Xiang River. Guan Yu guarded Liu Bei's territories in southern Jing Province while Lü Meng was in charge of Sun Quan's.

In 219, Lü Meng came up with a plan to help Sun Quan seize control of Liu Bei's territories in Jing Province. He pretended to be sick and asked for permission to return to Jianye to seek medical treatment. Sun Quan played along by pretending to approve his request. Lu Xun went to visit Lü Meng and said, "Guan Yu is near the border. How can we remain far behind the border and not worry about having to guard against him?" Lü Meng replied, "What you've said is true, but I'm seriously ill now." Lu Xun then said, "Guan Yu is proud of his own valour and he scorns others. He may have made great achievements, but he's overly conceited. Besides, he's heading north and he has never seen us a threat. When he knows you're sick, he'll definitely lower his defences. If we attack him when he lowers his guard, we can capture him. I came here to discuss with you a plan to attack him." Lü Meng replied, "Guan Yu is known for his bravery and ferocity in battle, and he's a formidable foe. Besides, he's in control of Jing Province. He governs with virtue and has made great accomplishments, while the morale of his army is at its peak. It won't be easy to defeat him."

Succeeding Lü Meng
When Lü Meng arrived in Jianye, Sun Quan asked him, "Who can replace you?" Lü Meng responded, "Lu Xun is careful and thoughtful. He has the ability to shoulder this important responsibility. Based on my observations of him, I believe he's capable of taking up greater responsibilities in the future. Besides, he's relatively unknown, so Guan Yu won't be wary of him. This can't be better. If he's appointed, our enemies will be unaware of our intentions, while we can assess our strengths better and seek an opportunity to launch the attack." Sun Quan followed Lü Meng's suggestion and commissioned Lu Xun as a Lieutenant-General and Inspector of the Right Section to replace Lü Meng in Jing Province.

When Lu Xun arrived at Lukou (陸口; at Lushui Lake near present-day Chibi, Hubei) to assume his new office, he wrote to Guan Yu to flatter him: 

Later, after Guan Yu defeated Yu Jin at the Battle of Fancheng, Lu Xun wrote a letter to Guan again to flatter him and put him off guard:

Invasion and pacification of Jing Province
Upon receiving the letters, Guan Yu saw that Lu Xun showed humility and expressed his desire to rely on him, so he felt at ease and lowered his guard. When Lu Xun heard about it, he wrote a report to Sun Quan and provided crucial details on how to defeat Guan Yu. Sun Quan secretly sent an army to invade Jing Province, with Lü Meng and Lu Xun leading the vanguard force. Lü Meng employed infiltration tactics to disable the watchtowers set up by Guan Yu along the Yangtze River, rendering them unable to warn Guan Yu about Sun Quan's advances, and then swiftly conquered Guan Yu's key bases in Jing Province – Gong'an County and Nan Commandery (南郡; around present-day Jiangling County, Hubei). For his contributions to the successful conquest of Jing Province, Lu Xun was appointed as the Administrator of Yidu Commandery (宜都郡; around present-day Yidu, Hubei), promoted to General Who Pacifies the Border, and enfeoffed as the Marquis of Hua Village. Fan You, the previous Administrator of Yidu Commandery under Guan Yu, abandoned his post and fled, while the officials and tribal chiefs in the commandery surrendered to Lu Xun. Lu Xun ordered official seals to be carved from gold, silver or bronze, and presented to these officials and tribal chiefs. This took place in around January 220.

Even after Sun Quan's forces successfully conquered southern Jing Province, there were still some areas which were still controlled by Liu Bei's forces or other hostile forces, so Lu Xun had to pacify those regions. He sent his subordinates Li Yi, Xie Jing and others to lead 3,000 troops to attack Liu Bei's officers Zhan Yan and Chen Feng. Li Yi led the naval forces while Xie Jing commanded the land army. They sealed the critical routes and defeated Zhan Yan and captured Chen Feng. They then attacked Deng Fu and Guo Mu, the Administrators of Fangling Commandery and Nanxiang County respectively, and defeated the enemy. Wen Bu and Deng Kai, two influential men in Zigui County, rallied thousands of local tribesmen to form an army to attack Lu Xun in the west. In response, Lu Xun sent Xie Jing to attack them. Wen Bu and Deng Kai were defeated and they fled west to the state of Shu Han (founded by Liu Bei in 221). Lu Xun successfully induced Wen Bu into defecting to Sun Quan's side.

Aftermath
Throughout these campaigns in Jing Province, Lu Xun had killed, captured or recruited tens of thousands of enemies. In recognition of Lu Xun's efforts, Sun Quan promoted him to Right Protector-General, General Who Guards the West, and promoted him from a village marquis to a county marquis under the title "Marquis of Lou". Sun Quan was very pleased with Lu Xun and wanted to specially honour him. However, even though Lu Xun already held the rank of a general and a marquis title, he still had to go through the standard protocol of receiving a recommendation from the chief administrating officer in his home province. Hence, Sun Quan ordered Lü Fan, the Governor of Yang Province, to "backdate" Lu Xun's service record by stating that he had previously employed Lu Xun as an aide-de-camp and recommended him as a maocai.

At the time, there were many educated men in Jing Province who had either obtained positions in the civil service or were unemployed, so Lu Xun wrote a proposal to Sun Quan:  Sun Quan accepted Lu Xun's proposal.

Battle of Xiaoting

Historical background
In late 220, Cao Pi forced Emperor Xian to abdicate the throne in his favour and ended the Han dynasty. He declared himself emperor and established the state of Cao Wei to replace the Han dynasty, marking the start of the Three Kingdoms period. Two years later, Liu Bei proclaimed himself emperor and established the state of Shu Han as a successor to the Han dynasty and to challenge Cao Pi's legitimacy. Sun Quan agreed to submit to Cao Pi's rule and received the title of a vassal king, King of Wu" (吳王). However, in late 222, he declared independence from the Cao Wei regime but retained his title "King of Wu".

Early stages
In early 222, Liu Bei personally led the Shu army to attack Sun Quan and retake his lost territories in southern Jing Province. Sun Quan appointed Lu Xun as Grand Chief Controller and put him in command of 50,000 troops to resist the enemy, with Zhu Ran, Pan Zhang, Song Qian, Han Dang, Xu Sheng, Xianyu Dan, Sun Huan and others serving as his subordinates. The Shu army passed through Wu Gorge, Jianping and Lianping until they arrived on the outskirts of Yiling (夷陵; present-day Yichang, Hubei), where they laid siege and built several camps. Liu Bei bribed the local tribes in Yiling with gold and silk to support him. He appointed Feng Xi（馮習） as his Chief Controller, Zhang Nan as the vanguard, and Fu Kuang, Zhao Rong, Liao Chun and Fu Rong as the controllers of the various divisions. He also sent Wu Ban to lead a few thousand men to construct camps on flat ground and provoke the Wu forces into attacking them.

When the Wu generals wanted to respond to the enemy's taunts, Lu Xun said, "This must be a trick. We should observe first." Earlier on, when the Shu army first arrived at Yiling, the Wu generals wanted to attack the enemy, but Lu Xun objected and said, "Liu Bei is leading an army east to attack us and his army's morale is very high. Besides, his forces are based in high and mountainous terrain, so it's difficult for us to attack them. Even if we manage to win, we cannot completely defeat them. If we suffer any setback, our morale will be greatly affected and this isn't a small issue. Now, we should raise our troops' morale and make plans while waiting for changes in the situation. If we're on plains and flat ground, we should be worrying about sustaining heavy losses in skirmishes and charges. However, since the enemy is on mountainous terrain, they can't carry out an all-out assault because they're sandwiched between wood and rocks. We should take advantage of this weakness of theirs." The Wu generals did not understand Lu Xun's reasoning and thought that he feared the enemy so they were very disgruntled with him.

When Liu Bei realised that his plan to lure Wu forces into attacking him had failed, he led the 8,000 troops out of the valley, where they had been waiting in ambush earlier. When Lu Xun heard about it, he told his subordinates, "The reason why I didn't follow your suggestions to attack the enemy is because I suspected there was something fishy about it." He then wrote a report to Sun Quan:

Burning of the Shu camps
The Wu generals said, "We should have attacked Liu Bei in the initial stages. Now, he has advanced further in by 500-600 li and we have been locked in a stalemate for seven to eight months. He has reinforced all his crucial positions, so even if we attack them it will yield nothing." Lu Xun replied, "Liu Bei is cunning and experienced. In the initial stage, his army was very focused and its morale was very high, so we couldn't defeat them then. Now, however, since it has been quite some time, they are already weary, low on morale, and out of ideas. Now is the time for us to launch a multi-pronged assault on them."

Lu Xun then targeted one enemy camp and attacked it but failed to capture it. The Wu officers complained, "We're sacrificing our soldiers' lives for nothing." Lu Xun replied, "I have devised a strategy for defeating the enemy." He then ordered his men to carry a pile of straw each and launch a fire attack on the enemy. Upon the commencement of the fire attack, Lu Xun led all the Wu units on an all-out assault on the Shu forces. The Shu generals Zhang Nan and Feng Xi, and the tribal king Shamoke (Liu Bei's ally) were killed in battle, while the Wu forces destroyed over 40 Shu camps.

The Shu officers Du Lu, Liu Ning and others surrendered when they saw they had no chance of escaping. Liu Bei and his remaining troops retreated to the Ma'an Hills, where they continued to be fiercely assaulted by Wu forces from all directions. At the same time, landslides occurred at the Ma'an Hills and caused the Shu forces to suffer thousands of casualties. Liu Bei fled at night and ordered his men to pile up their armour and set them on fire to create barriers for the pursuing enemy. By the time Liu Bei reached the safety of Baidicheng, all his boats, military equipment and supplies had been captured by Wu forces. The dead bodies of Shu soldiers floated in the river and obstructed its flow. Liu Bei was extremely upset and furious with his defeat. He exclaimed, "Is it not the will of Heaven that I must be humiliated by Lu Xun?"

Incidents during the battle
During the preliminary stages of the Battle of Xiaoting, Sun Huan had led a separate force to attack the Shu vanguard force at Yidao but ended up being besieged by the enemy. He requested for reinforcements from Lu Xun but was denied. The other Wu officers said, "General Sun is a relative of our lord. He's under siege, so shouldn't we help him?" Lu Xun replied, "He has the support of his men, his base is well defended, and he has sufficient supplies. There's nothing to worry about. When my plans are set in motion, even if we don't go to his aid, the siege on him will automatically be lifted." After the Wu victory, Sun Huan came to see Lu Xun and said, "Earlier on, I was indeed very resentful when you refused to help me. But now, after the victory, I see you have your own way of doing things."

Many of the Wu officers who participated in the battle had either served in Wu since Sun Ce's time or were relatives of the Sun family, so they viewed themselves highly and were unwilling to follow Lu Xun's orders. Lu Xun placed his sword on the desk and said,  The Wu officers began to show greater respect towards Lu Xun after the Wu victory, which was largely due to his strategies.

When Sun Quan heard about this incident, he asked Lu Xun, "Why didn't you report to me about the generals refusing to follow your orders?" Lu Xun replied,  Sun Quan laughed and praised Lu Xun. Lu Xun was promoted to General Who Assists the State, appointed as Governor of Jing Province, and had his marquis title changed to "Marquis of Jiangling".

Aftermath
After Liu Bei had retreated to Baidicheng, Xu Sheng, Pan Zhang, Song Qian and other Wu generals suggested to attack Baidicheng and capture Liu Bei. When Sun Quan asked Lu Xun for his opinion, Lu, along with Zhu Ran and Luo Tong, said that when Cao Pi amassed his forces and seemed like he was going to help Wu attack Shu, he was actually harbouring sinister intentions, so they should be cautious, abandon their pursuit of Liu Bei, and return to Wu. Not long later, Cao Pi led the Wei armies to invade Wu from three directions.

When Liu Bei heard of the Wei invasion of Wu, he still had his armies and scouts on and around the border, Zhuge Liang, Li Yan, Liu Yan, Zhao Yun and many other Han officials, even those who agreed with the campaign to reclaim Jing insisted on renewing the alliance of Wu. With both Zhuge Jin and Lu Xun offering peace in letters because of the threat of a Wei invasion with Sun Quan's refusal to send his son as a hostage, Liu finally agreed and wrote to Lu to not only renew the alliance but coordinate an attack against Wei: "The enemy (Wei) is at Jiangling now. If I launch another attack again, in your opinion, do you think I will succeed?" Lu Xun replied: 

Liu Bei died in 223 and was succeeded by his son, Liu Shan, as the emperor of Shu. Zhuge Liang became Shu's head of government and he made peace with Wu and reestablished the Wu–Shu alliance against Wei. Sun Quan granted permission to Lu Xun to reply to Zhuge Liang on his behalf, and had a duplicate of his own official seal made and sent to Lu's office. Whenever Sun Quan wrote to Liu Shan and Zhuge Liang, he would allow Lu Xun to read the letters, make the appropriate modifications, stamp his official seal on them and have them delivered to Shu.

Battle of Shiting

In 228, Sun Quan instructed Zhou Fang, the Administrator of Poyang Commandery, to pretend to defect to Cao Xiu, the Grand Marshal of Wei, and lure Wei forces to attack Wu. Cao Xiu fell for the ruse and led his armies to attack the Wu garrison at Wan County (皖縣; present-day Qianshan County, Anhui). Sun Quan granted Lu Xun a yellow ceremonial axe, appointed him as Grand Chief Controller again, and put him in command of six Wu armies and the imperial guards to resist the Wei invaders. Lu Xun thus had the authority to act on Sun Quan's behalf. Sun Quan even waved a ceremonial whip and ordered all his subjects to pay their respects to Lu Xun.

When Cao Xiu realised he had been deceived by Zhou Fang, he felt humiliated but decided to continue the campaign anyway because he had superiority in numbers and his troops were well-trained. During the Battle of Shiting, Lu Xun remained in the central command, with Zhu Huan and Quan Cong leading the armies on his left and right flanks respectively. Their three armies advanced together and defeated Cao Xiu's forces lying in ambush and drove them further northward until Jiashi. They killed and captured thousands of enemies and obtained much of the enemy's livestock, equipment and supplies. Cao Xiu died of illness after returning to Wei. Lu Xun and the victorious Wu forces returned to Wuchang (武昌; present-day Ezhou, Hubei), where Sun Quan held a grand reception for them. Sun Quan instructed his servants to shield Lu Xun with his imperial parasol when he entered or left the palace, and rewarded Lu Xun with many gifts. The honours Lu Xun received were unprecedented in his time. He moved to Xiling County (西陵縣; present-day Xiling District, Yichang, Hubei) after that.

Mid career
In 229, after Sun Quan declared himself emperor and established the state of Eastern Wu in Wuchang (武昌; present-day Ezhou, Hubei), he appointed Lu Xun as Senior General-in-Chief and Right Protector-General. That year, Sun Quan embarked on an inspection tour of Jianye in the east, leaving behind his crown prince Sun Deng, his other sons, and some high-ranking officials in charge of Wuchang. Lu Xun was instructed to assist Sun Deng and oversee all civil and military affairs in Jing Province and three other commanderies.

Treatment of Sun Lü and Sun Song, and criticism of Liu Yi
At the time, Sun Quan's second son Sun Lü, the Marquis of Jianchang, enjoyed watching duck fights so he had a small shed built in front of the main hall of his residence to stage duck fights. When Lu Xun heard about it, he reprimanded Sun Lü sternly, "Marquis, you should be spending time reading the classics and enriching yourself with knowledge. Why are you doing this?" Sun Lü immediately had the shed torn down. Sun Song (孫松; Sun Yi's son), the Colonel of Trainee Archers, who was one of Sun Quan's favourite relatives, allowed his men to fool around in camp and did not maintain good military discipline. Lu Xun punished Sun Song's subordinates by having their heads shaved.

Xie Jing admired Liu Yi's discourse on punishment before civility. Lu Xun chided Xie Jing, "The idea of civility before punishment has been long promulgated and espoused. Liu Yi is wrong when he distorted the teachings of ancient sages through his sly manipulation of words. You're serving in the Crown Prince's residence, so you should advocate the principles of benevolence and righteousness in order to promote moral virtues. Ideas (like Liu Yi's) should never be discussed again."

Memorial on current affairs
Even though Lu Xun was stationed far away from the Wu capital, he was still very concerned about his state. He once wrote a memorial on current affairs to Sun Quan:

Advising Sun Quan against the Yizhou and Zhuya campaigns
When Sun Quan was planning to send armies to conquer Yizhou (夷州; present-day Taiwan) and Zhuya (朱崖; present-day Hainan), he asked Lu Xun for his opinion. Lu Xun wrote a memorial to Sun Quan, advising him against the campaigns:  Sun Quan ignored Lu Xun's advice and launched the campaigns. Lu Xun's predictions were right as the losses incurred by Wu in the conquests outweighed the gains.

Advising Sun Quan against the Liaodong campaign
In 237, the Liaodong warlord Gongsun Yuan rebelled against Wu's rival state Wei and allied with Wu, but broke the alliance later. Sun Quan was angered and he wanted to personally lead an army to attack Liaodong. Lu Xun wrote another memorial to dissuade Sun Quan from the campaign:  Sun Quan heeded his advice.

Xiangyang campaign

In 234, when Sun Quan led a 100,000 strong army to attack the Wei fortress of Xincheng at Hefei, he ordered Lu Xun and Zhuge Jin to lead another 10,000 troops to attack the Wei city of Xiangyang. Lu Xun sent a close aide, Han Bian, to deliver a report to Sun Quan. On the journey back, Han Bian was captured by a Wei patrol. When Zhuge Jin received news of Han Bian's capture, he became fearful so he wrote to Lu Xun: "His Majesty has withdrawn his forces. The enemy has captured Han Bian and they know our situation. The rivers have dried up so we should make a hasty retreat." Lu Xun did not respond, and he instructed his men to plant turnips and peas, while he played weiqi and other games with his officers as though nothing had happened. Zhuge Jin said, "Boyan possesses intelligence and strategy, he knows what he's doing." He came to see Lu Xun, who told him, "The enemy knows that His Majesty has withdrawn his forces, so they have no worries and will concentrate their attacks on us. Besides, they have already stationed troops at critical positions and are poised to strike. Hence, we should remain composed and calm our men, after which we will have a change of plans and prepare to withdraw. If we display signs of retreat now, the enemy will think that we are afraid and will definitely attack us, resulting in defeat for us."

Lu Xun then secretly conveyed his plan to Zhuge Jin and ordered him to supervise the fleet of vessels on which they would sail back to Wu, while he gathered his troops and headed towards Xiangyang. The Wei forces had been wary of Lu Xun all this while so they immediately retreated back into the city when they saw Lu Xun's army approaching. Lu Xun organised his men in an orderly manner and instructed them to pretend to prepare for an attack on Xiangyang. By then, Zhuge Jin and the fleet had shown up, so Lu Xun and his forces progressively retreated to the vessels and left. The Wei forces in Xiangyang did not dare to make any move.

Raid in Shiyang
On their journey back to Wu, the fleet passed by Baiwei, where Lu Xun announced that they would be getting off their vessels to go ashore for a hunting expedition. However, he actually gave secret orders to his subordinates Zhou Jun and Zhang Liang to lead their men to attack Xinshi, Anlu and Shiyang counties in Jiangxia Commandery. Outside Shiyang County, the common people were going about their daily activities in the marketplace when Zhou Jun and his men showed up. The people immediately packed up everything and attempted to rush to safety behind the city walls. The Wei soldiers in Shiyang wanted to close the city gates but the civilians were blocking the way, so they killed some people and forced the gates to be shut. Zhou Jun and his men killed and captured over 1,000 civilians in Shiyang. The captives were resettled in Wu. Lu Xun gave orders to his men, forbidding them from harassing the people. Those captives who had their families with them were given due attention and care while those who lost their loved ones during the raid were provided with food and clothing and treated well before they were sent home. Many people were so touched by Lu Xun's acts of kindness that they decided to move to Wu territory. When news of Lu Xun's kindness spread to the neighbouring regions, two Wei officers, Zhao Zhuo and Fei Sheng, and a tribal king, Meiyi, led their followers to join Lu Xun. Lu Xun generously distributed rewards to them.

Criticism
The historian Pei Songzhi, who annotated Lu Xun's biography in the Records of the Three Kingdoms, condemned the raid on Shiyang County and said it was totally uncalled for. He commented: 

In response to Lu Xun's "acts of kindness" after the raid, Pei Songzhi remarked:

Later career

Eliminating Lu Shi
Lu Shi, the Administrator of the Wei-controlled Jiangxia Commandery, often led his men to cause trouble at the border between Wu and Wei. When Lu Xun heard that Lu Shi could not get along with Wen Xiu, a son of the veteran Wei general Wen Ping, he came up with a plan to stop Lu Shi. He pretended to have received a letter from Lu Shi and wrote a "reply" as such: "I can sense your sincerity and sorrow when you told me you have disagreements with Wen Xiu. You said both of you cannot exist together and you intend to defect to my side. I have delivered your letter to my lord and will gather my men to welcome you. You should make preparations soon and inform us of the date of your defection." He then left the "reply" letter at the border, where it was picked up by Lu Shi's men. When Lu Shi heard about it, he became afraid and immediately sent his family to the Wei capital Luoyang. His subordinates became distrustful of him and eventually he was dismissed from office.

Criticism
Commenting on this incident, the historian Pei Songzhi wrote:

Suppressing rebellions in Wu
In 237, Zhou Zhi, a General of the Household, wanted to recruit soldiers from Poyang Commandery so he sought Lu Xun's opinion. Lu Xun believed that the people in Poyang were very restless and should not be recruited for military service because they might rebel. Zhou Zhi ignored Lu Xun's advice and persisted. As Lu Xun predicted, the people in Poyang started a rebellion under the leadership of Wu Ju and they killed Zhou Zhi and seized control of many counties. The people in the nearby Yuzhang and Luling commanderies had a history of being rebellious, so they responded to Wu Ju's call and joined the revolt. Lu Xun led his forces to suppress the rebellion and succeeded in forcing Wu Ju and the rebels to surrender. He recruited over 8,000 men into his army and pacified the three commanderies.

Incident of Lü Yi

At the time, Lü Yi, the supervisor of the audit bureau, was abusing his powers. Lu Xun and the Minister of Ceremonies, Pan Jun, expressed their worries about Lü Yi's behaviour to Sun Quan, to the point of shedding tears. After Lü Yi's crimes were exposed later, Sun Quan had him executed and deeply regretted not listening to Lu Xun and Pan Jun.

Advice to Sun Quan on governance
Xie Yuan and Xie Gong, proposed implementing changes to policies to increase government revenue, so Sun Quan sought Lu Xun's opinion on this issue. Lu Xun argued,

Chancellorship
Sometime between 27 January and 25 February 244, Lu Xun succeeded Gu Yong as the Imperial Chancellor of Wu. Sun Quan's imperial edict read:

Role in the succession struggle

There were vacancies in the appointments available in the estates (or offices) of two of Sun Quan's sons: Sun He, the Crown Prince and Sun Ba, the Prince of Lu. Many officials nominated their relatives to fill up these positions in the hope of building connections with the princes. When Quan Cong told Lu Xun about this, Lu Xun said that many of the nominated candidates were actually not up to standard. He argued that those officials were actually promoting nepotism and pursuing their own interests. He also worried that if those officials' relatives turned out to be incompetent, it could lead to serious problems in the administration. Lu Xun also foresaw that conflict was bound to break out between the two princes because they were equally influential and had their own factions supporting them. He believed that a power struggle between the princes would be detrimental to Eastern Wu's prosperity and stability. Quan Cong's son, Quan Ji, became a close aide to Sun Ba and helped him in his fight against Sun He. Lu Xun wrote to Quan Cong to warn him: "If you don't learn from Ma Midi and choose to let (Quan) Ji have his way, you'll bring disaster upon yourself and your family." Quan Cong ignored Lu Xun's advice and their relationship became strained.

When there were rumours that Sun He could no longer secure his position as Crown Prince, Lu Xun wrote a memorial to Sun Quan: "The Crown Prince is the legitimate heir apparent so he should have a foundation as solid as hard rock. The Prince of Lu is a vassal and a subject of the state, so he should receive less favours than the Crown Prince. If both of them know their places, Your Majesty and all your subjects will have peace. I humbly kowtow and beg Your Majesty, to the point of bleeding (from my forehead), to (re)consider this issue carefully." He wrote several memorials to Sun Quan and even requested to leave Wuchang (武昌; present-day Ezhou, Hubei) and go to the capital to speak up on this problem. Sun Quan denied him permission. Lu Xun's maternal nephews Gu Tan, Gu Cheng and Yao Xin, who supported Sun He during the succession struggle, were sent into exile. Wu Can, the Crown Prince's Tutor, who had been exchanging letters with Lu Xun, was imprisoned and later executed.

Death and aftermath
Sun Quan repeatedly sent emissaries to Wuchang (武昌; present-day Ezhou, Hubei) to reprimand Lu Xun for interfering with the succession. Lu Xun died on 19 March 245 in anger and frustration at the age of 63 (by East Asian age reckoning). Lu Xun was a thrifty man. When he died, he left behind little or no wealth for his family. Sometime between 258 and 264, Sun Xiu, the third Wu emperor, awarded Lu Xun the posthumous title "Marquis Zhao" (昭侯; literally "illustrious marquis").

The succession struggle concluded in 250 – five years after Lu Xun's death – with Sun Quan deposing Sun He and replacing him with Sun Liang, and forcing Sun Ba to commit suicide. Many officials who were involved in the conflict (i.e., supported either Sun He or Sun Ba) met with unhappy ends.

In the winter of 251, about half a year before his death, Sun Quan regretted what he did to Lu Xun. When he was sending off Lu Xun's son Lu Kang back to Chaisang, with tears in his eyes he told Lu Kang, "Previously, I believed slanderous rumours and failed to understand your father's well-meaning advice. I've let you down. I've burnt all the documents containing the allegations against your father so that nobody can ever see them."

Appraisal
When Ji Yan proposed introducing drastic reforms in the Wu administration (which included the dismissal of many officials he deemed incompetent), Lu Xun cautioned Sun Quan against that and accurately predicted that it would lead to problems. Lu Xun once told Zhuge Ke, "I respect those who are superior to me in status; I assist those who are subordinate to me. I see you behave arrogantly in front of those superior to you, and you belittle those subordinate to you. This isn't the way to build a stable career." In another incident, Yang Zhu became famous in his youth, but Lu Xun predicted that he was doomed to failure, so he advised Yang Zhu's elder brother, Yang Mu, to break ties with Yang Zhu. Lu Xun's prediction came true as Yang Zhu later got into trouble during the Sun He-Sun Ba succession struggle.

The historian Chen Shou, who wrote Lu Xun's biography in the Records of the Three Kingdoms, commented on Lu Xun as such: "Liu Bei was a hero of his time and many people feared him. Lu Xun, then in his prime years and relatively unknown, managed to defeat Liu Bei. Lu Xun's brilliant strategies, when combined with Sun Quan's recognition of his talent, resulted in the accomplishment of a great task. Lu Xun was loyal, honest and sincere. He died worrying about his state's future, and was perhaps an important pillar of his state."

Family and relatives
Sometime after 216, when Lu Xun was commissioned as Colonel Who Establishes Might. Under Sun Quan's arrangement, Lu Xun married the eldest daughter of Sun Quan's elder brother and predecessor Sun Ce.

Lu Xun's eldest son, Lu Yan, died at a young age. Lu Xun's marquis title was inherited by his second son, Lu Kang, who became a prominent general in Eastern Wu during the reign of the last Wu emperor Sun Hao. Lu Kang had six sons: Lu Yan, Lu Jing, Lu Xuan, Lu Ji, Lu Yun and Lu Dan.

Lu Xun's younger brother, Lu Mao, also served as an official in Eastern Wu.

Lu Ji, a son of Lu Xun's granduncle Lu Kang, was one of the 24 Filial Exemplars and served as an official under Sun Quan.

Lu Kai, a relative of Lu Xun, served as the ninth Imperial Chancellor of Eastern Wu.

In Romance of the Three Kingdoms
Lu Xun appeared as a character in the historical novel Romance of the Three Kingdoms by Luo Guanzhong, which romanticises the historical events before and during the Three Kingdoms period. His most significant moment in the novel, apart from his role in the Battle of Xiaoting, is a fictional encounter he had after the battle.

In popular culture

Lu Xun is featured as a playable character in Koei's Dynasty Warriors video game series, as well as Warriors Orochi, a crossover between Dynasty Warriors and Samurai Warriors. He also appears in Koei's strategy game series Romance of the Three Kingdoms.

In the trading card game Magic: The Gathering, there is a card called "Lu Xun, Scholar General" in the Portal Three Kingdoms set.

He was played by the actor Shao Feng in the 2010 Chinese television series Three Kingdoms.

See also
 Lists of people of the Three Kingdoms

Notes

References
 Citations from the Sanguozhi

 Chen, Shou (3rd century). Records of the Three Kingdoms (Sanguozhi).
 Citations from annotations in the Sanguozhi

 Pei, Songzhi (5th century). Annotations to Records of the Three Kingdoms (Sanguozhi zhu).
 Other sources

 Fan, Ye (5th century). Book of the Later Han (Houhanshu).
 Luo, Guanzhong (14th century). Romance of the Three Kingdoms (Sanguo Yanyi).
 Sima, Guang (1084). Zizhi Tongjian.
 Sima, Qian (1st century BCE). Records of the Grand Historian (Shi Ji).

183 births
245 deaths
3rd-century heads of government
Chinese chancellors
Eastern Wu generals
Eastern Wu politicians
Generals under Sun Quan
Han dynasty generals from Jiangsu
Han dynasty politicians from Jiangsu
Officials under Sun Quan
Political office-holders in Hubei
Politicians from Suzhou
Sun Ce and associates